The 1977 Marlboro South Australian Men's Tennis Classic was a men's tennis tournament played on outdoor grass courts in Adelaide, Australia. The event was part of the 1977 Grand Prix circuit and categorized as a two–star event. It was the 77th edition of the tournament and was held from 10 January through 16 January 1977. The singles title and $13,500 prize money was won by Victor Amaya.

Finals

Singles

 Victor Amaya defeated  Brian Teacher 6–1, 6–4
 It was Amaya's first singles title of the year and of his career.

Doubles

 Cliff Letcher /  Dick Stockton defeated  Syd Ball /  Kim Warwick 6–3, 4–6, 6–4
 It was Letcher's only title of the year and the 1st of his career. It was Stockton's 1st title of the year and the 13th of his career.

References

External links
 ATP tournament profile
 ITF tournament edition details

 

 
Marlboro South Australian Men's Tennis Classic
Marlboro South Australian Men's Tennis Classic, 1972
Marlboro South Australian Men's Tennis Classic
Marlboro South Australian Men's Tennis Classic